{{DISPLAYTITLE:C40H64}}
The molecular formula C40H64 (molar mass: 544.94 g/mol, exact mass: 544.5008 u) may refer to:

 Phytoene
 any tetraterpene

Molecular formulas